Indonesia competed at the 2019 Summer Universiade in Naples, Italy held from 3 to 14 July 2019. The country won one bronze medal, in taekwondo.

Competitors 
The following is a list of the number of competitors representing Indonesia that participated at the Games:

Medal summary

Medal by sports

Medalists

Archery

Recurve

Compound

Athletics 

Track & road events
Men

Women

Field events
Men

Women

Diving

Men

Gymnastics

Artistic
Individual

Swimming 

Men

Women

Taekwondo

Tennis

References

External links 
 Official website

Nations at the 2019 Summer Universiade
Summer U
Indonesia at the Summer Universiade